Michael Lee Scurlock Jr. (born February 26, 1972) is a former American football player and coach.  He played professionally in the National Football League (NFL) with the St. Louis Rams from 1995 to 1998 and the Carolina Panthers in 1999.

Early years
Born in Tucson, Arizona, Scurlock attended Sunnyside High School and later transferred to Cholla High School. He played college football at the University of Arizona, where he graduated with a B.A. in media arts.

Scurlock, nicknamed "Scurry," had 67 tackles as a freshman after redshirt year. In his sophomore year, he had nine tackles versus UCLA. He played seven games at nickelback his junior year and was Super Sleeper choice by Poor Man's Guide to the NFL Draft as a senior. He was All-Arizona at running back. He lettered four times each in football and track.

NFL career
In the 1995 NFL Draft, the Arizona standout was selected by the St. Louis Rams in the fifth round (140th pick overall). He went to the Carolina Panthers in 1999. After five seasons in the NFL, he retired on January 2, 2000.

See also
List of St. Louis Rams players
List of Carolina Panthers players

External links
 

1972 births
Living people
American football defensive backs
Arizona Wildcats football players
Carolina Panthers players
St. Louis Rams players
High school football coaches in South Carolina
Players of American football from Tucson, Arizona